Samalkot railway station (station code:SLO) is an Indian Railways station in Samalkot of East Godavari district in the Indian state of Andhra Pradesh. It lies on the Howrah–Chennai main line and a junction station for Samalkot–Kakinada Port branch line, administered under Vijayawada railway division of South Coast Railway zone (formerly South Central Railway zone).

History
The southern part of the East Coast State Railway (from Waltair to Vijayawada) was taken over by Madras Railway in 1901.

Classification 
In terms of earnings and outward passengers handled, Samalkot is categorized as a Non-Suburban Grade-3 (NSG-3) railway station. Based on the re–categorization of Indian Railway stations for the period of 2017–18 and 2022–23, an NSG–3 category station earns between – crore and handles  passengers.

Station amenities 
Samalkot is one of the 38 stations in the division to be equipped with Automatic Ticket Vending Machines (ATVMs).

Halting trains

References

External links

 Trains at Samalkot

Railway stations in East Godavari district
Vijayawada railway division
Railway junction stations in Andhra Pradesh
1893 establishments in India